Julien Benneteau and Jo-Wilfried Tsonga were the defending champions, but Benneteau chose to not participate due to left wrist injury.
Tsonga partnered with Michaël Llodra, but they were eliminated by Novak Djokovic and Jonathan Erlich already in the first round.
3rd seeds Jürgen Melzer and Leander Paes won in the final match 7–5, 4–6, [10–5], against Mariusz Fyrstenberg and Marcin Matkowski.

Seeds
All seed pairs received a bye to the second round.

Draw

Finals

Top half

Bottom half

References
General

Specific

Shanghai Rolex Masters 1000 - Doubles
2010 Shanghai Rolex Masters